Pentagnostus is a genus of trilobites restricted to the Middle Cambrian. Its remains have been found in Siberia, Australia, North America, Scandinavia, and Kazakhstan.

Taxonomy 

The probable ancestor of Pentagnostus is Archaeagnostus. Two subgenera can be distinguished. The nominate subgenus occurred first and developed into the later subgenus Pentagnostus (Meragnostus) and the family Ptychagnostidae.

Species and distribution

Subgenus Pentagnostus (Pentagnostus) 
 P. anabarensis Lermontova, 1940 (type)
 P. ademptus (Prokovskaya and Jegorova, 1972)
 P. brighamensis (Resser, 1938)
 P. shergouldi Laurie, 2004
 P. veles Öpik, 1979 synonym P. endemicus.

Subgenus Pentagnostus (Meragnostus) 
 P. bonnerensis (Resser, 1939) (type) synonyms P. admirabilis and Agnostus lautus.
 P. bulkurensis (Prokovskaya and Pregel, 1982)
 P. remotus (Prokovskaya and Jegorova, 1969)
 P. segmentus (Robison, 1964)
 P. shabactensis Ergaliev, 2008 synonym Peronopsis ultima Ergaliev, 1980 non Poulsen 1960.

References 

Peronopsidae
Agnostida genera
Cambrian trilobites
Cambrian trilobites of Australia
Fossils of Kazakhstan
Fossils of Russia
Paleozoic life of British Columbia
Cambrian genus extinctions